Dido was founder and first queen of Carthage.

Dido or DIDO may also refer to:

Arts
 Dido, Queen of Carthage (play), a play by Christopher Marlowe
 Dido and Aeneas, an opera by Henry Purcell
 Dido, Queen of Carthage (opera), an opera by Stephen Storace
 "Dido", a song on Café del Mar Aria
 Fido Dido, a cartoon character

People
 Dido (singer), a British singer-songwriter
 Dido Ali, Kenyan politician
 Dido Elizabeth Belle, daughter of John Lindsay
 Dido Fontana, an Italian photographer
 Dido (footballer), a Brazilian footballer
 Dido Harding, Baroness Harding of Winscombe
 Dido Miles, an English actress

Transport
 HMS Dido, the name of seven British Royal Navy vessels
 Dido (train) a train, typically for railway staff, provided on a Day in, day out basis

Other
 The Tsez people, or Dido, an indigenous people of the North Caucasus
 The Tsez language, or Dido, the language of the Tsez people
 DIDO (nuclear reactor), a nuclear reactor at the Atomic Energy Research Establishment
 DIDO (software), software for solving optimal control problems
 209 Dido, a very large main-belt asteroid
 DIDO (network), "distributed input distributed output" wireless network technology
 Dido, Texas, a ghost town in Tarrant County, Texas
 Dido's problem, the isoperimetric problem in mathematics

See also